The Dutch Futures was a golf tournament on the Challenge Tour from 2007 to 2009. It was played at the Golfclub Houtrak in Halfweg, the Netherlands.

Winners

External links
Coverage on the Challenge Tour's official site

Former Challenge Tour events
Golf tournaments in the Netherlands